Gábor Straka (born 18 December 1981) is a Hungarian-Slovak footballer who currently plays for FK DAC 1904 Dunajská Streda.

External links
 

1981 births
Living people
Slovak footballers
Hungarians in Slovakia
Association football midfielders
FC DAC 1904 Dunajská Streda players
Ruch Chorzów players
Sportspeople from Dunajská Streda
Expatriate footballers in Poland
Slovak expatriate sportspeople in Poland
FC Petržalka players
Slovak expatriate footballers